Concepcion is an unincorporated community and census-designated place (CDP) in Duval County, Texas, United States. The population was 62 at the 2010 census.

Geography
Concepcion is located in southeastern Duval County at  (27.394906, -98.356171).

Demographics
As of the census of 2000, there were 61 people, 26 households, and 17 families residing in the CDP. The population density was 760.8 people per square mile (294.4/km2). There were 35 housing units at an average density of 436.5 per square mile (168.9/km2). The racial makeup of the CDP was 78.69% White, 21.31% from other races. Hispanic or Latino of any race were 100.00% of the population.

There were 26 households, out of which 3.8% had children under the age of 18 living with them, 53.8% were married couples living together, 11.5% had a female householder with no husband present, and 34.6% were non-families. 34.6% of all households were made up of individuals, and 26.9% had someone living alone who was 65 years of age or older. The average household size was 2.35 and the average family size was 3.06.

In the CDP, the population was spread out, with 8.2% under the age of 18, 9.8% from 18 to 24, 18.0% from 25 to 44, 31.1% from 45 to 64, and 32.8% who were 65 years of age or older. The median age was 58 years. For every 100 females, there were 96.8 males. For every 100 females age 18 and over, there were 100.0 males.

The median income for a household in the CDP was $40,208, and the median income for a family was $41,042. Males had a median income of $18,750 versus $0 for females. The per capita income for the CDP was $10,286. None of the population or families were below the poverty line.

Concepcion TX is home to the oldest Catholic church in South Texas, a small chapel built in 1866 and renovated in 1947.  The town is known by the Spanish nickname "La Chona," which means "the village."  Several other places in Mexico and California also share this nickname.

Education
Concepcion is served by the Benavides Independent School District.

References

Census-designated places in Duval County, Texas
Census-designated places in Texas
Unincorporated communities in Duval County, Texas
Unincorporated communities in Texas